John Major, Leader of the Conservative Party was Leader of the Opposition from 2 May 1997, following his defeat at the 1997 general election, until 19 June 1997, when William Hague was elected to succeed him. Following the defeat, Major announced his resignation as leader. But, for logistical reasons, a new leader could not be elected for several weeks. In the intervening period, Major appointed an interim Shadow Cabinet.

The Shadow Cabinet was based on Major's final Cabinet. However, as seven Cabinet Ministers had lost their seats in the general election and another had not contested his seat, there were several vacancies. These were largely filled by either Major himself or by a relevant minister in the outgoing Cabinet.

The position of Shadow Secretary of State for Scotland was not filled as the Conservatives had lost all their Scottish MPs in the election. Michael Howard and William Hague were given joint responsibility for constitutional matters, including the brief to handle the Scottish devolution legislation.

Shadow Cabinet list

See also

External links

Official Opposition (United Kingdom)
1997 establishments in the United Kingdom
1997 in British politics
John Major
1997 disestablishments in the United Kingdom
British shadow cabinets
Conservative Party (UK)-related lists